Harvey White may refer to:

 Harvey White (American football) (born 1938), American football quarterback
 Harvey White (surgeon) (born 1936), surgeon and oncologist
 Harvey Elliott White (1902–1988), American physicist and professor
 Harvey White (footballer) (born 2001), English footballer